Succinic anhydride, is an organic compound with the molecular formula (CH2CO)2O.  This colorless solid is the acid anhydride of succinic acid.

Preparation
In the laboratory, this material can be prepared by dehydration of succinic acid. Such dehydration can occur with the help of acetyl chloride or phosphoryl chloride, or thermally.

Industrially, succinic anhydride is prepared by catalytic hydrogenation of maleic anhydride.

Reactions
Succinic anhydride hydrolyzes readily to give succinic acid:
(CH2CO)2O + H2O → (CH2CO2H)2
With alcohols (ROH), a similar reaction occurs, delivering the monoester:
(CH2CO)2O + ROH → RO2CCH2CH2CO2H

Succinic anhydride is used in acylations under Friedel-Crafts conditions, as illustrated by the industrial route to the drug Fenbufen.

Related compounds

Maleic anhydride undergoes the Alder-ene reaction with alkenes to give alkenylsuccinic anhydrides. Such compounds are sizing agents in the paper industry. In this role, the anhydride is proposed to form an ester with the hydroxyl groups on the cellulose fibers. Maleic anhydride undergoes a similar reaction with polyisobutylene to give polyisobutylenylsuccinic anhydride, a common building block chemical in the petroleum additives industry.

See also
 Maleic anhydride

References

Carboxylic anhydrides
Oxygen heterocycles
Pentacyclic compounds